Londa Schiebinger (born May 13, 1952) is the John L. Hinds Professor of History of Science, Department of History, and by courtesy the d-school, Stanford University.  She received her Ph.D. from Harvard University in 1984. An international authority on the theory, practice, and history of gender and intersectionality in science, technology, and medicine, she is the founding Director of Gendered Innovations in Science, Medicine, Engineering, and Environment. She is an elected member of the American Academy of Arts and Sciences. Schiebinger received honorary doctorates from the Vrije Universiteit Brussel, Belgium (2013), from the Faculty of Science, Lund University, Sweden (2017), and from Universitat de València, Spain (2018). She was the first woman in the field of History to win the prestigious Alexander von Humboldt Research Prize in 1999.

Over the past thirty years, Schiebinger has analyzed what she calls the three “fixes”:
"Fix the Numbers of Women" focuses on increasing the underrepresented groups participating in science and engineering; "Fix the Institutions" promotes equity in careers through structural change in research organizations; and "Fix the Knowledge" or "gendered innovations" stimulates excellence in science and technology by integrating sex, gender, and intersectional analysis into research design. As a result of this work, she was recruited in a national search to direct Stanford University's Clayman Institute for Gender Research, a post she held from 2004 to 2010.   Her job was to promote and support research on women and gender across Stanford University—from engineering, to philosophy, to medicine and business. In 2010 and 2014, she presented the keynote address and wrote the conceptual background paper for the United Nations' Expert Group Meeting on Gender, Science, and Technology. The UN Resolutions of March 2011 call for “gender-based analysis ... in science and technology” and for the integrations of a “gender perspective in science and technology curricula.” Again in 2022, she prepared the background paper for the United Nations 67th session of the Commission on the Status of Women’s priority theme, Innovation and Technological Change, and Education in the Digital Age for Achieving Gender Equality and The Empowerment of all Women and Girls.

In 2013 she presented the Gendered Innovations project at the European Parliament. Gendered Innovations was also presented to the South Korean National Assembly in 2014. In 2015, Schiebinger addressed 600 participants from 40 countries on Gendered Innovations at the Gender Summit 6—Asia Pacific, a meeting devoted to gendered innovations in research. She speaks globally on gendered innovations—from Brazil to Japan, and her work was recently presented in a Palace Symposium for the King and Queen of the Netherlands at the Royal Palace in Amsterdam. In 2018-2020, she led a European Commission Expert Group to produce Gendered Innovations 2: How Inclusive Analysis Contributes to Research and Innovation.

Schiebinger's work is highly interdisciplinary. In recognition of her creative work across academic fields of research, she was awarded the Interdisciplinary Leadership Award in the Stanford Medical School in 2010, the Linda Pollin Women's Heart Health Leadership Award from the Cedars-Sinai Medical Center in Los Angeles in 2015, the Impact of Gender/Sex on Innovation and Novel Technologies Pioneer Award in 2016, and the American Medical Women's Association President's Recognition Award in 2017. She has held prestigious Fellowships at the Max Planck Institute for the History of Science in Berlin (1999–2000) and at the Stanford Humanities Center (2010/2011, 2017/2018, 2022/2023). She served as an advisor to the Berlin University Alliance, 2022/23.

Major works

Gendered Innovations in Science, Health & Medicine, Engineering, and Environment (2009-)
Schiebinger coined the term “gendered innovations” in 2005. In 2009, she launched Gendered Innovations in Science, Health & Medicine, Engineering, and Environment, a field of research and methodology, at Stanford University. The project was joined by the European Commission in 2011, by the U.S. National Science Foundation in 2012. Gendered Innovations received funding from the European Commission again in 2018/20 and from the U.S. National Science Foundation (2020/22 to expand methodologies and case studies. This project has brought together over 220 natural scientists, engineers, and gender experts in a series of collaborative workshop that drew talent from across the US, Europe, Canada, Asia, and, more recently, South Africa and Latin America. The project served as the intellectual foundations for the “gender dimension in research” requirements in the European Commission's Horizon 2020 funding framework. A Center for Gendered Innovations in Science and Technology Research was founded in Seoul, Republic of Korea, 2016; and the Institute for Gendered Innovation was created at Ochanomizu University, Tokyo, Japan, 2022.

Gendered Innovations has developed practical methods of sex, gender, and intersectional analysis for STEM, and provided case studies as examples of how this type of analysis leads to discovery and innovations. The project highlights case studies, ranging from stem cell research, to osteoporosis research in men, to inclusive crash test dummies, social robots, machine learning, menstrual cups, nutrigenomics, marine science, medical technologies, and assistive technology for the elderly.

Of special note is the case study of Google Translate. In 2012, the gendered innovations team discovered that Google Translate defaults to the masculine pronoun because “he said” is more commonly found on the web than “she said.” Although this bias is unconscious, it has serious consequences. Unconscious gender bias from the past amplifies gender inequality in the future. When trained on historical data (as Google Translate is), the system inherits bias (including gender bias). In other words, past bias is perpetuated into the future, even when governments, universities, and companies, such as Google, themselves have implemented policies to foster equality. The goal of Gendered Innovations is to provide methods of analysis to help scientists and engineers can get the research right from the beginning.

Schiebinger has also worked to create infrastructure for gender-responsible science across the three pillars of academic infrastructure: funding agencies, peer-reviewed journals, and universities. She advises funding agencies, including the German Science Foundation and the U.S. National Science Foundation, on policies for integrating sex, gender, and diversity analysis into research. She and colleagues published guidelines for editors of medical journals to evaluate sex and gender analysis in manuscripts submitted for publication. She also seeks to help universities integrate social analysis into core natural science and engineering curricula. Finally, she advises industry on develop products that meet the needs of complex and diverse user groups.

Has Feminism Changed Science? (1999)
Schiebinger's book, Has Feminism Changed Science?, has been split into three sections: 'Women in Science', 'Gender in the Cultures of Science', and 'Gender in the Substance of Science'.  Throughout the book, she describes the factors that led to the inequality between male and female in the science field. In addition, she gave examples of different types of women in the society. An important idea brought up in the book was the private versus the public, where the private sphere is seen as the domain of women and public sphere as an area refers for men. Another important point she brought up was that the idea of including women in the fields of science does not mean that the sciences will adopt a more feminist view point. A simple increase in the number of women in a given field does not change the culture of that field. The construction of gender and science is a cycle in that ideas of gender are brought to the table already when practicing science and can inform what evidence people look for or areas they choose to study, and that whatever is found then influences theories of gender. The various contradictions shown through the achievements and silencing of women in science throughout history shows how nature and the society can influence gender and science. Schiebinger not only addresses the gender in the context of science, she also describes the feminism is changed through the history and culture. It is important to note that the book is written from a Western perspective and that the culture she discusses is that of the Western World, and in many cases, more specifically, the United States.

The first of the book's three sections takes a look at the impacts of some of the first women to be known to have participated in science, such as Christine de Pizan and Marie Curie. The section also examines the numerical count of women in the various fields of science in academics in the late 20th century United States, as well as looking at the breakdown of other factors, such as pay rates and the level of degree held, in relation to gender. The section goes on to theorize that the cultural reinforcement of gender roles may play a factor as to why there are fewer women in science.

The second section, 'Gender in the Cultures of Science', argues that science has been gendered as being a masculine field and that women report a distaste for the excessive competition fostered by academic science. The section also argues that the splitting of gender roles in personal life, where women still take on a majority of domestic responsibilities, may be a reason that is hindering women in scientific fields from accomplishing more.

The third section of the book, 'Gender in the substance of Science' details the perspectives that women have brought to fields such as medicine, primatology, archeology, biology, and physics. In fact, Schiebinger states that as of the writing of the book, that women earned nearly 80 percent of all Ph.D.s in primatology, and yet, despite this, having a large number of women scientists in a field does not necessarily lead to a change in the assumptions of science, or the culture of science.

The Mind Has No Sex? Women in the Origins of Modern Science (1989)
Using a theory coined by François Poullain de la Barre, Schiebinger's prize-winning historical work focuses on eighteenth-century history of science and medicine. The Mind Has No Sex? Women in the Origins of Modern Science (1989) is one of the first scholarly works to investigate women and gender in the origins of modern Western science. The Mind Has No Sex? exposed the privileged first-born twins of modern science: the myth of the natural body, and the myth of value-neutral knowledge. As Schiebinger demonstrates, the claim of science to objectivity was the linchpin holding together a system that rendered women's exclusion from science invisible, and made this exclusion appear fair and just. She argues that women were ready and willing to take their place in science in the early modern period in astronomy, physics, mathematics, anatomy, and botany. But it was not to be.

Schiebinger first identifies these women and the structures of early modern European society that allowed them a place in science. Of note is her work on German women working in guild-like sciences—Maria Sibylla Merian and Maria Margarethe Winkelmann. Schiebinger uncovered the story of Winkelmann, a noted astronomer, and described important paths not taken with respect to women in science in the eighteenth century. Winkemann, for example, applied to be the astronomer of the royal academy of sciences in Berlin when her husband died in 1710. Despite the great philosopher Gottfried Wilhelm Leibniz’s support, she was rejected. With that, the door slammed on women astronomers for the next several centuries.

Not only were women, such as Merian and Winkelmann, excluded from modern science but something called “femininity” was also excluded. The best known part of this book is Schiebinger's chapter on “Skeletons in the Closet,” where she tells the story of the first illustrations of female skeletons in European anatomy. Schiebinger argues that it was the attempt to define the position of women (especially white middle-class women) in European society at large and in science in particular that spawned the first representations of the female skeleton. Great debate arose over the particular strengths and weakness of these female skeletons, focusing in particular on depictions of the skull as a measure of intelligence and pelvis as a measure of womanliness. After the 1750s, the anatomy of sex difference provided a kind of bedrock upon which to build natural relations between the sexes. The seemingly superior build of the male body (and mind) was cited to justify his social role. At the same time, the particularities of the female body justified her natural role as wife and mother. Women were not to be men's equals in science and society, but their complements.

This internationally acclaimed book has been translated into Japanese, German, Chinese, Portuguese, Spanish, Korean, and Greek.

Nature's Body: Gender in the Making of Modern Science (1993)
This book, written immediately after The Mind has No Sex?, focuses on how knowledge is gendered.  It explores how gender structured important aspects of the content of early modern science, with case studies exploring the sexing of plants, the gender politics of taxonomies and nomenclatures, the gendering of apes, and the agency ascribed to women in shaping racial characters. Her chapter on the “Private Lives of Plants,” focuses on Carl Linnaeus and how his taxonomies contributed to naturalizing the role of “woman” in modern culture. Quaint hyperbole of plants celebrating steamy nuptials on softly perfumed pedaled beds surrounded the discovery of plant sexuality. Plant sexuality was strongly assimilated to heterosexual models of human affections, even though the majority of the flowers are hermaphroditic. Here Schiebinger reveals how Linnaean taxonomy recapitulated social hierarchies by setting the taxon defined by the male stamens above that defined by female pistils.

Best known is her chapter “Why Mammals are Called Mammals.” recounting the torrid history of the breast in eighteenth-century Europe. More importantly, this chapter zeroes in on how notions of gender formed scientific taxonomies, and how these taxonomies buttressed gender roles in science and society. By emphasizing how natural it was for females—both human and nonhuman—to suckle their own children, Linnaeus's newly coined Mammalia helped to legitimize the restructuring of European society in an age of cultural upheaval and revolution.

This book also contains chapters on the eighteenth-century origins of scientific studies of sex and race, and their relation to questions about who should be included and who excluded from newly emerging scientific institutions.

Nature's Body won the 1995 Ludwik Fleck Book Prize from the Society for Social Studies of Science, and her article, “Why Mammals are Called Mammals,” featured on the cover of the American Historical Review, won the 1994 History of Women in Science Prize from the History of Science Society.

Plants and Empire: Colonial Bioprospecting in the Atlantic World (2004)
Shifting attention from Europe to the Atlantic World, Schiebinger published Plants and Empire in 2004. Developing a new methodology, ”agnotology” (defined as the cultural history of ignorance), she explores the movement, triumph, suppression, and extinction of the diverse knowledges in the course of eighteenth-century encounters between Europeans and the inhabitants of the Caribbean—both indigenous Amerindians and African slaves. While much history of colonial science has focused on how knowledge is made and moved between continents and heterodox traditions, Schiebinger explores instances of the nontransfer of important bodies of knowledge from the New World into Europe.

Schiebinger tells the remarkable story of Maria Sibylla Merian, one of the few European women to voyage for science in the eighteenth century. In a moving passage in her magnificent 1705 Metamorphosis insectorum Surinamensium, the German-born naturalist Merian recorded how the Indian and African slave populations in Surinam, then a Dutch colony, used the seeds of a plant she identified as the flos pavonis, literally ‘peacock flower’, as an abortifacient to abort their children so they would not become slaves like themselves. This book reveals how gender relations in Europe and its West Indian colonies influenced what European bioprospectors collected—and failed to collect—as they entered the rich knowledge traditions of the Caribbean.  As Schiebinger tells, abortifacients were a body of knowledge that did not circulate freely between the West Indies and Europe. Trade winds of prevailing opinion impeded shiploads of New World abortifacients and knowledge of their use from ever reaching Europe.

This book won the prize in Atlantic History from the American Historical Association in 2005, the Alf Andrew Heggoy Book Prize from the French Colonial Historical Society in 2005, and the J. Worth Estes Prize for the History of Pharmacology from the American Association for the History of Medicine in 2005. These prizes demonstrate her ability to win the admiration of scholars across a wide-variety of disciplines.

Secret Cures of Slaves: People, Plants, and Medicine in the Eighteenth-Century Atlantic World (2017) 
From 1932 to 1972, 600 impoverished Alabamian African-American sharecroppers were exploited by the U.S. Public Health Service in its Tuskegee Syphilis Study (1932–1972). This book explores the eighteenth-century background of medical experimentation with humans, asking in particular if the large populations of enslaved people, concentrated on American plantations, were used as human guinea pigs.

A major finding of Secret Cures of Slaves is that, in many instances, European physicians in the British and French West Indies did not—as might be expected—use enslaved people as guinea pigs. Enslaved laborers were considered valuable property of powerful plantation owners whom doctors were employed to serve. The master's will prevailed over a doctor's advice, and colonial physicians did not always have a free hand in devising medical experiments to answer scientific questions.

Yet, enslaved people were exploited in eighteenth-century. Schiebinger tells those stories, and also sets these findings firmly in the context of slavery, colonial expansion, the development of drug testing, and medical ethics of the time.  It seeks to answer questions about sex and race in medical testing. Specifically, how were human subjects in this period chosen for experiments, and how were notions of uniformity and variability across living organisms developed? Did physicians imagine a natural human body that once tested held universally? Were tests done on white bodies thought to hold for Black bodies (and vice versa)? Were male and female bodies considered interchangeable in this regard? These questions are today still key to the mission of protecting and improving human health.

Schiebinger also expands our knowledge of African and Amerindian contributions to health and medicine. Europeans, from the sixteenth through to the end of the eighteenth century, tended to value medical knowledge of the peoples they encountered around the world, especially those who were experienced in what we today call tropical medicine. In the Caribbean, Europeans tested many of these medical techniques. Schiebinger explores what was thought of at the time as “slave medicine” (often a fusion of Amerindian and African cures) in the eighteenth-century West Indies in order to gather and evaluate African and American contributions to health and healing. She argues that proper care of enslaved people as well as soldiers and sailors was a matter of moral concern in this period to be sure, but also a means to secure the wealth of nations. Schiebinger analyzes the circulation of medical knowledge between Africa, Europe, and the Americas, and emphasizes that knowledge created in this period did not respond to science for its own sake, but was fired in the colonial crucible of conquest, slavery, violence, and secrecy.

Personal life 
Her partner is Robert N. Proctor, and her children are Geoffrey Schiebinger, now professor of mathematics and computational biology, and Jonathan Proctor, now professor of environmental economics. She and her husband each gave their name to one of their two children.

Selected bibliography 
 A Framework for Sex, Gender, and Diversity Analysis in Research: Funding Agencies Have Ample Room to Improve Their Policies (Science, 2022) doi:10.1126/science.abp977
 Sex and Gender Analysis Improves Science and Engineering (Nature, 2019) doi:10.1038/s41586-019-1657-6
 AI can be Sexist and Racist— It’s Time to Make it Fair (Nature, 2018) doi:10.1038/d41586-018-05707-8
 Secret Cures of Slaves: People, Plants, and Medicine in the Eighteenth-Century Atlantic World (Stanford University Press, 2017) 
 Women and Gender in Science and Technology, 4 vols. (London: Routledge, 2014), 
 Gendered Innovations: How Gender Analysis Contributes to Research, ed. with Ineke Klinge (Luxembourg: Publications Office of the European Union, 2013) 
 "Changing Assumptions", American Scientist, September–October 2008

Selected media coverage
 "Londa Schiebinger: Inclusive Design Will Help Create AI That Works for Everyone", by Prabha Kannan, Stanford Human-Centered AI Institute, July 2022.
 "Women in STEM Need More Than a Law", by Caitlin McDermott-Murphy, Harvard Gazette, June 22, 2022
 "The Researcher Fighting to Embed Analysis of Sex and Gender into Science", by Elizabeth Gibney, Nature, November 2020
 "Academics 'Need Training' on Sex and Gender in Research", by Ellie Bothwell, Times Higher Education, November 7, 2019
 "Gender Diversity is Linked to Research Diversity, Stanford Historian Says", by Amy Adams, Stanford News, October 4, 2018
 "Why Gendered Medicine Can Be Good Medicine", by Rena Xu, The New Yorker, November 6, 2017

Peer-reviewed website
 Gendered Innovations in Science, Health & Medicine, Engineering, and Environment.

Prizes and awards
Schiebinger's awards have included
 Global Navigation Board Member, University of Tokyo, Japan, 2023
 Berlin Falling Walls Breakthrough Winner in Science & Innovation Management, 2022
 Honorary Doctorate, Universitat de València, Spain, 2018
 Honorary Doctorate, Faculty of Science, Lund University, Sweden, 2017
 Medical Women's Association President's Recognition Award, 2017
 Impact of Gender/Sex on Innovation and Novel Technologies Pioneer Award, 2016
 Linda Pollin Women's Heart Health Leadership Award, Cedars-Sinai Medical Center, 2015
 Elected to the American Academy of Arts and Sciences, 2014
 Honorary Doctorate, Vrije Universiteit Brussel, 2013
 Distinguished Affiliated Professor, Technische Universität, Münichen, 2011-
 Board of Trustees, Institute for Advanced Studies, Technische Universität, Munich, 2011-
 Interdisciplinary Leadership Award, 2010, Women's Health, Stanford School of Medicine
 2007-2009 Board of Trustees, RWTH Aachen, Germany
 2006 Maria Goeppert-Meyer distinguished Visitor, Oldenburg University, Germany
 2005 Prize in Atlantic History, American Historical Association, for Plants and Empire
 2005 Alf Andrew Heggoy Book Prize, French Colonial Historical Society, for Plants and Empire
 2005 J. Worth Estes Prize for the History of Pharmacology, American Association for the History of Medicine, for Feminist History of Colonial Science
 2005 Jantine Tammes Chair, Faculty of Mathematics and Natural Sciences, University of Groningen, the Netherlands
 1999 Alexander von Humboldt Research Prize, Berlin
 2001-2004 National Science Foundation Grant
 2002-2004 National Science Foundation Scholars Award
 1999-2000 Max-Planck-Institut für Wissenschaftsgeschichte, Berlin Senior Research Fellow
 1998 National Institutes of Health, National Library of Medicine Fellowship
 1994 Margaret W. Rossiter History of Women in Science Prize
 1991–1993, 1996 National Science Foundation Scholars Award
 1995 Deutsche Forschungsgemeinschaft
 1991–1992 Guggenheim Fellow
 1988–1989 Rockefeller Foundation Humanist-in-Residence
 1986–1987 National Endowment for the Humanities Fellowship
 1985-1986 Rockefeller Foundation Fellowship
 Summer 1985 Deutscher Akademischer Austauschdienst Grant
 1983–1984 Charlotte W. Newcombe Doctoral Dissertation Fellowship, Woodrow Wilson Foundation
 Summer 1982 Marion and Jasper Whiting Fellowship, Paris
 1980–1981 Fulbright-Hayes Graduate Scholar in Germany

References

External links
 Interview for KanaalZ, Belgian television
 TEDx CERN
 "Housework is an Academic Issue," profiled on ABC News.
 Michelle R. Clayman Institute for Gender Research
 "Londa Schiebinger", The Economist
 "Sex, Knowledge and Society", Australian Broadcasting Corporation
 "Londa Schiebinger talks Gender and Science", Stanford University Press
 Gendered Innovations: Designing Better Research"
 "Tuve hijos tarde para poder pagar una asistenta"  El Pais
 Gender News Clayman Institute, Stanford University
 Inside Higher Education
 Sex in Science Yields Gendered Innovations on MyScienceWork
  Stanford Daily, Stanford University
 Sister Ape, London Review of Books, April 19, 1990
 Science from Women's Lives. Better Science? How Gendered Studies Improve Science and Lives, Methode
 STEM—the acronym for science, technology, engineering and math—has sparked a nationwide debate about education, gender, immigration and the future of the U.S. economy, CNN Money
 Gendered Innovations: Making Research Better
 Why It's Crucial to Get More Women Into Science, National Geographic
 Det kan bli umulig å publisere i Science eller Nature hvis artikkelen din ikke har et kjønnsperspektiv, sier Stanford-professor
 Technology's Man Problem
 L’innovazione di genere è migliore
 Maeil Business News Korea
 The Kukmin Daily, Seoul

Living people
Stanford University Department of History faculty
Harvard University alumni
University of Nebraska–Lincoln alumni
Historians of science
21st-century American historians
American women historians
1952 births
21st-century American women writers